Brian-Paul Frits Tesselaar (born 24 December 1989) is a football player who plays for LSVV. Born in the Netherlands, he represents the Anguilla national team.

International career
Tesselaar was called up to the Anguilla national team in January 2022 for a friendly against the British Virgin Islands. He and his brother, Jan-Willem, went on to make their international debuts in the eventual 2–1 victory on 27 January. The players qualify to represent the island nation through their grandmother.

Career statistics

International

References

External links

1989 births
Living people
Dutch footballers
Association football defenders
AFC '34 players
Anguilla international footballers